The name Vasilis Charalampopoulos may refer to:

Vassilis Charalampopoulos (basketball), Greek basketball player
Vassilis Charalampopoulos (actor), Greek actor